Hunter Wise Financial Group was a Financial Industry Regulatory Authority (FINRA) and Securities Investor Protection Corporation (SIPC) member firm and penny stock broker-dealer. The company had fifteen U.S. locations and two international offices in Beijing and London.  The company was based in Irvine, California.

History
Fred Jager founded Hunter Wise in 1999. The firm advised on penny stock, recapitalizations, equity investments, and acquisitions.

Awards and recognition
Hunter Wise Financial Group was nominated at the 10th Annual M&A Awards for Lower Middle-Market Deal of the Year, Cross-Border Deal of the Year, and Industrial Goods and Basic Resources categories for its work with Farm Lands of Guinea.

External links

References

Financial services companies established in 1999